Jerzy Musiałek (14 October 1942 – 15 January 1980) was a Polish footballer. He played in thirteen matches for the Poland national football team from 1961 to 1967.

References

External links
 

1942 births
1980 deaths
Polish footballers
Poland international footballers
Place of birth missing
Association footballers not categorized by position